Chile's Fernando González and Nicolás Massú defeated Germany's Nicolas Kiefer and Rainer Schüttler in the final, 6–2, 4–6, 3–6, 7–6(9–7), 6–4 to win the gold medal in Men's Doubles tennis at the 2004 Summer Olympics. It was Chile's first ever Olympic gold medal. Massú and González also won gold and bronze, respectively, in the singles competition. Germany won its third medal in four Games in the event. In the bronze medal match, Croatia's Mario Ančić and Ivan Ljubičić defeated India's Mahesh Bhupathi and Leander Paes, 7–6(7–5), 4–6, 16–14. It was Croatia's first medal in men's doubles since 1992.

The tournament held between 15 and 21 August at the Olympic Tennis Centre in Athens, Greece. There were 30 pairs from 24 nations, with the Belarusian pair and one of the Swedish pairs not starting. For the first time since tennis returned in 1988, nations could enter more than one pair; the limit was now two pairs (four players).

World No. 1 team Bob Bryan and Mike Bryan of the United States were the favorites for the title, but they were upset in the quarterfinals by González and Massú.

Background

This was the 12th appearance of men's doubles tennis. The event has been held at every Summer Olympics where tennis has been on the program: from 1896 to 1924 and then from 1988 to the current program. A demonstration event was held in 1968.

Mark Woodforde had retired after the 2000 Games, ending The Woodies partnership with Todd Woodbridge that had earned gold in 1996 and silver in 2000. Woodbridge played in his fourth Games, with partner Wayne Arthurs (tennis)—still a formidable pairing, and the number two seed in Athens. The new top team, however, was the American pair of Bryan brothers, Bob Bryan and Mike Bryan. 2000 gold medalist Daniel Nestor of Canada returned with a new partner, Frédéric Niemeyer.

Poland made its debut in the event. France made its ninth appearance in the event, matching the absent Great Britain for most of all nations.

Competition format

The competition was a single-elimination tournament with a bronze medal match. All matches except the final were best-of-three sets; the final was best-of-five. Tiebreaks were used for any set before the third (fifth in the final) that reached 6–6.

Schedule

All times are Greece Standard Time (UTC+2)

Seeds

Draw

Finals

Top half

Bottom half

References

ITF Olympic Site

2004
Men's Doubles
Men's events at the 2004 Summer Olympics